Dracaena (romanized form of the Greek δράκαινα - drakaina, "female dragon") can mean:

Drakaina (mythology), a Greek mythological entity
Dracaena (plant), a genus of plants
Cordyline australis, a plant commonly known as the Dracaena palm
Dracaena (lizard), a genus of lizard
Dracena, a town in Brazil
Dracaena, a fictional dragon-woman in Percy Jackson & the Olympians
Drakaina (model) (born 1975), a French actress and model.

See also

Dragon (disambiguation)
Draco (disambiguation)
Drago (disambiguation)

Genus disambiguation pages